Tut-e Chehreh (also Romanized as Tūt-e Chehreh) is a village in Tang-e Haft Rural District, Papi District, Khorramabad County, Lorestan Province, Iran. At the 2006 census, its population was 81, in 12 families.

References 

Towns and villages in Khorramabad County